Block E may refer to:

 Block E (Minneapolis) a historic block of downtown Minneapolis
 Block E (rocket), a Soviet rocket propulsion module
 E-Blocks, US voting technology
 E-blocks, rapid prototyping electronics

See also
 Block (disambiguation)
 E (disambiguation)